Tenellia phoenix is a species of sea slug, an aeolid nudibranch, a marine gastropod mollusc in the family Fionidae.

Distribution
This species was described from La Jolla, California, United States. It has been reported from Monterey Bay to Mission Bay (San Diego), California and Costa Rica.

Description
Tenellia phoenix is a small translucent aeolid with swollen cerata and a visible central line of digestive gland which shows through the skin. It is reminiscent of Tergipes tergipes or Eubranchus rupium but intermediate between these species in the number and arrangement of its cerata. The oral tentacles and rhinophores are suffused with brown pigment.

References 

Fionidae
Gastropods described in 1981